Commercial cleaning companies are contracted to carry out cleaning jobs in a variety of premises.

Cleaning techniques and equipment

Commercial office cleaning companies use a wide variety of cleaning methods, chemicals, and equipment to facilitate and expedite the cleaning process.  The scope of work may include all internal, general and routine cleaning - including floors, tiles, partition walls, internal walls, suspended ceilings, lighting, furniture and cleaning, window cleaning, deep cleans of sanitary conveniences and washing facilities, kitchens and dining areas, consumables and feminine hygiene facilities as well as cleaning of telephones, IT, and other periodic cleaning as required. Essentially, everything involved with a commercial business, be it cleaning a property for a real estate agent, or cleaning the aftermath of a building project. Carpet cleaning though, even with regular vacuuming, needs hot water extraction applied every 18 to 24 months. External cleaning, litter picking, and removal of graffiti may also be incorporated.

The two global cleaning industry associations, the British Institute of Cleaning Science (BICSc) and the International Sanitary Supply Association (ISSA), both publish standards for managers and operatives engaged in cleaning activities.

Consumables
Contracts often require the cleaning companies to provide consumables such as paper towels, toilet rolls, liquid soap, bin liners, etc.

Workers

The commercial cleaning industry is extremely competitive and employees tend to be at the lower end of the pay scale. However, unionized workers may earn higher wages. Many commercial cleaning companies provide on-the-job training for all new employees due to the nonexistence of tertiary based courses for the cleaning industry. A trend in the cleaning industry is the elimination of the usage of more hazardous chemicals such as drain cleaners due to liability and environmental concerns. Individuals employed in commercial cleaning typically hold the job title of janitor, custodian, or day porter.

In Australia, the United States, and Europe, commercial cleaning companies are encouraged to screen all employees for evidence of a criminal background. In some countries, such as the United Kingdom, cleaners working in schools, children's care homes and childcare premises are required by law to undergo a criminal record check

See also
 List of cleaning companies

References

Cleaning industry